The 2009 Big Ten baseball tournament was held at Huntington Park in Columbus, Ohio, from May 20 through 24.  Third seeded  won their second tournament championship and earned the Big Ten Conference's automatic bid to the 2009 NCAA Division I baseball tournament.

Format and seeding
The 2009 tournament was a 6-team double-elimination tournament, with seeds determined by conference regular season winning percentage only.  As in the previous seven years, the top two seeds received a single bye, with the four lower seeds playing opening round games.  The top seed played the lowest seeded winner from the opening round, with the second seed playing the higher seed.  Teams that lost in the opening round played an elimination game.

|}

Results

* - Indicats game required extra innings.

All-Tournament Team
The following players were named to the All-Tournament Team.

Most Outstanding Player
Matt Bashore was named Most Outstanding Player.  Bashore was a pitcher for Indiana.

References

Tournament
Big Ten baseball tournament
Big Ten Baseball Tournament
Big Ten baseball tournament